Washington County is a county located in the U.S. state of Kentucky. As of the 2020 census, the population was 12,027. Its county seat is Springfield. The county is named for George Washington. Washington County was the first county formed in the Commonwealth of Kentucky when it reached statehood, and the sixteenth county formed. The center of population of Kentucky is located in Washington County, in the city of Willisburg. The county is dry, meaning that the sale of alcohol is prohibited, but it contains the "wet" city of Springfield, where retail alcohol sales are allowed. This classifies the jurisdiction as a moist county. Three wineries operate in the county and are licensed separately to sell to the public. Jacob Beam, founder of Jim Beam whiskey, sold his first barrel of whiskey in Washington County.

History
Washington County was established in 1792 from land taken from Nelson County. It was the first county created by the Commonwealth of Kentucky after its separation from Virginia.

The Washington County Courthouse, completed in 1816, is the oldest courthouse still in use in Kentucky. A significant county court record is the marriage bond of Thomas Lincoln and Nancy Hanks, parents of President Abraham Lincoln. The bond is dated June 10, 1806; it was written the day before the marriage in the small community of Beechland, on the Little Beech River. The marriage return was signed by Jesse Head, the Methodist preacher who performed the ceremony, and dates the marriage to June 12, 1806.

Geography

Adjacent counties
 Anderson County - northeast
 Mercer County - east
 Boyle County - east
 Marion County - south
 Nelson County - west

Demographics

As of the census of 2000, there were 10,916 people, 4,121 households, and 3,020 families residing in the county. The racial makeup of the county was 90.62% White, 7.51% Black or African American, 0.16% Native American, 0.28% Asian, 0.61% from other races, and 0.82% from two or more races.  1.60% of the population were Hispanic or Latino of any race.

There were 4,121 households, out of which 33.10% had children under the age of 18 living with them, 59.50% were married couples living together, 10.00% had a female householder with no husband present, and 26.70% were non-families. 24.00% of all households were made up of individuals, and 11.40% had someone living alone who was 65 years of age or older.  The average household size was 2.57 and the average family size was 3.03.

The age distribution was 25.30% under the age of 18, 8.80% from 18 to 24, 27.90% from 25 to 44, 23.10% from 45 to 64, and 15.00% who were 65 years of age or older.  The median age was 37 years. For every 100 females there were 96.60 males.  For every 100 females age 18 and over, there were 91.90 males.

The median income for a household in the county was $33,136, and the median income for a family was $39,240. Males had a median income of $27,624 versus $21,593 for females. The per capita income for the county was $15,722.  About 10.30% of families and 13.50% of the population were below the poverty line, including 14.40% of those under age 18 and 19.60% of those age 65 or over.

Education
The county is served by Washington County Schools, a district that contains five schools:
 North Washington Elementary School in Willisburg for grades PK, K-8 with 468 students
 Washington County Elementary School in Springfield for grades PK, K-5 with 387 students
 Care Academy, Inc. in Willisburg for grades 6–12 with 65 students
 Washington County Middle School in Springfield for grades 6–8 with 206 students
 Washington County High School in Springfield for grades 9–12 with 626 students

St. Catharine College (now closed) is located near Springfield.

Communities

 Bear Wallow
 Brush Grove
 Fredericktown
 Mackville
 Manton
 Pleasant Grove
 Saint Catharine
 Springfield (county seat)
 Thompsonville
 Willisburg
 Mooresville
 Maud

Politics

See also
 National Register of Historic Places listings in Washington County, Kentucky

References

 
Kentucky counties
1792 establishments in Kentucky
Populated places established in 1792